The Simons River is a short river in Delaware in the United States, approximately 3 mi (5 km) long. It drains a wetlands area on the southern shore of Delaware Bay.

It is formed in Bombay Hook National Wildlife Refuge approximately 5 mi (8 km) northwest of Dover, Delaware, by the confluence of Herring Branch and Green Creek. It flows in a serpentine course to the Delaware. The river is flanked on the north by the mouth of the Leipsic River.

See also
List of rivers of Delaware

References

Rivers of Delaware
Rivers of Kent County, Delaware
Tributaries of Delaware Bay